Fermín Antonini (born 2 July 1997) is an Argentine professional footballer who plays as a midfielder for Deportivo Riestra.

Career
Antonini's career started in the system of Eclipse Villegas, who he signed for in 2001 - remaining until 2013 when he joined Sarmiento's academy. Ricardo Caruso Lombardi was the manager who selected Antonini for his bow in senior football, with the midfielder starting a goalless draw at home to Godoy Cruz in the Primera División. He made a total of three appearances during 2016, as he did in the subsequent 2016–17 campaign; which ended with Sarmiento being relegated. He featured seven times in 2017–18 as the club reached the promotion play-off finals, though Antonini missed the season's end due to an anterior cruciate ligament injury.

In January 2022, Antonini was loaned out to Primera Nacional club CSD Flandria. The spell at Flandria was cut short, and on 14 June 2022, he made a move to Deportivo Riestra.

Personal life
Antonini's brother, Juan, is a fellow professional footballer. They are nephews of former footballer Rubén Piaggio. Their other uncle, along with their father, grandfather and cousins, played for regional clubs in the General Villegas area.

Career statistics
.

References

External links

1997 births
Living people
Sportspeople from Buenos Aires Province
Argentine sportspeople of Italian descent
Argentine footballers
Association football midfielders
Argentine Primera División players
Primera Nacional players
Club Atlético Sarmiento footballers
Flandria footballers
Deportivo Riestra players